The 1947 Bethune–Cookman Wildcats football team was an American football team that represented Bethune Cookman College as a member of the Southeastern Athletic Conference (SEAC) during the 1947 college football season. In their first season under head coach Bunky Matthews, the team compiled an 8–1–1 record, held opponent to an average of 4.5 points per game, and outscored all opponents by a total of 283 to 45. 

The Dickinson System rated Bethune-Cookman in a tie for No. 12 among the black college football teams for 1946. 

The team played its home games in Daytona Beach, Florida.

Schedule

References

Bethune-Cookman
Bethune–Cookman Wildcats football seasons
Bethune-Cookman Wildcats football